Events in the year 1991 in  Turkey.

Parliament 
18th Parliament of Turkey (up to 20 October)
19th Parliament of Turkey

Incumbents 
President – Turgut Özal
Prime Minister –
 Yıldırım Akbulut (up to 23 June)
Mesut Yılmaz (23 June – 20 November)
Süleyman Demirel (from 20 November)

Leader of the opposition –
 Erdal İnönü (up to 20 November)
Mesut Yılmaz (from 20 November)

Ruling party and the main opposition 
 Ruling party –
Motherland Party (ANAP) (up to 20 November)
True Path Party (DYP) (from 20 November)

 Main opposition-
Social Democratic Populist Party (SHP) (up to 20 November)
Motherland Party (ANAP) (from 20 November)

Cabinet 
47th government of Turkey
48th government of Turkey
49th government of Turkey

Events 
5 January – Prime minister Yıldırım Akbulut met with the coal mine workers who were on strike.
1 April – A tent city in Hakkari Province for Iraqi refugees was founded
 8 April – It was announced that the number of refugees in Turkey was 300000
30 April – A sharp raise in government controlled commodity prices
19 May – Beşiktaş won the championship of the Turkish football league
9 June – Socialist International summit in İstanbul sponsored by SHP
23 June – After the party congress of ANAP Yıldırım Akbulut was replaced by Mesut Yılmaz in the government
6 July – Lale Aytaman was appointed as the Muğla Province governor. She was the first female governor
 7 August – Compulsory education term was increased from 5 years to 8 years .
 28 August – 52 deaths in an international bus (Iran-Liiban) accident in Ağrı Province
20 October – General elections ( DYP 178 seats, ANAP 115 seats, SHP 88 seats, RP 62 seats, DSP 7 seats)
20 November – First coalition government (DYP-SHP) of Turkey after 1980 period
5 December – An assassination attempt to Doğan Güreş the chief of staff (by poison)

Births 
3 January – Özgür Çek, footballer
30 January – Arzu Karabulut, female footballer
24 February – Semih Kaya, footballer
1 March – Berkan Afşarlı, footballer
1 March – Nazlı Çağla Dönertaş, female yacht racer
8 April – Alper Potuk, footballer
14 April – Melisa Aslı Pamuk, model
3 July – Ezgi Çağlar, female footballer
5 July – Günay Güvenç, footballer
25 July – Hasan Piker, youtuber
13 September – Noyan Öz, footballer
17 September – Ali Gökdemir, footballer
27 October – Hüseyin Atalay, footballer
11 December – Alper Uludağ, footballer

Deaths 
6 January – Adnan Saygun (born 1907), musician
21 March – Vedat Dalokay (born 1927), architect
22 April – Feriha Tevfik (born 1910), first beauty pageant of Turkey
23 May – Kemal Satır (born 1911) MD, politician
2 June – Ahmet Arif (born 1927), poet
6 June – Adnan Süvari (born 1926), football coach
5 September – Fahrelnissa Zeid (born 1901), painter
13 September – Metin Oktay (born 1936) footballer
13 October – Adnan Ersöz (born 1917), military general

Gallery

See also 
1990–91 1.Lig
Turkey in the Eurovision Song Contest 1991

References 

 
Years of the 20th century in Turkey
Turkey
Turkey
Turkey